Žemaičių žemė (Samogitian: Žemaitiu žemė) was a quarterly magazine published by the , Samogitian Academy, and Academic Samogitian Youth Corporation "Samogitia". It was published from 1993 to 2016. Most of the articles were written in the Lithuanian language, but there were some in the Samogitian dialect. In 2011, the magazine was only available online. It focused on regional (Samogitian) culture and history.

History 
The first issue was released under the name Žemaitija. Its predecessor was the newspaper , published from 1990 to 1993.

Circulation 
In 1993, the circulation was 3,000, but it went down to 1,800 by 1997. The circulation in 2014–2016 was 1,000.

Organization 

References

External links
 The newspaper's electronic version (archive)

Magazines established in 1993
Magazines disestablished in 2016
1993 establishments in Lithuania
2016 disestablishments in Lithuania
Samogitia
Magazines published in Lithuania